Ambassadeurs is an 1892 lithograph poster by French artist Henri de Toulouse-Lautrec. The subject of the poster is Toulouse-Lautrec's friend cabaret singer Aristide Bruant.

References

Lithographs